The Sun Odyssey 32.2 is a French sailboat that was designed by Jacques Fauroux as a cruiser and first built in 1998.

Production
The design was built by Jeanneau in France, from 1988 to 2002, but it is now out of production.

Design
The Sun Odyssey 32.2 is a recreational keelboat, built predominantly of fiberglass, with wood trim. It has a masthead sloop rig, with a single set of swept spreaders and aluminum spars with stainless steel wire rigging. The hull has a raked stem, a reverse transom with steps, an internally mounted spade-type rudder controlled by a wheel and a fixed fin keel or optional lifting keel. It displaces  and carries  of ballast in the fin keel model and carries  of ballast in the lifting keel version.

The design has sleeping accommodation for four people, with a double "V"-berth in the bow cabin, two slightly curved settees in the main cabin around a drop-leaf table and an aft cabin with a double berth on the port side. The galley is located on the port side just forward of the companionway ladder. The galley is "L"-shaped and is equipped with a two-burner stove, an ice box and a sink. A navigation station is opposite the galley, on the starboard side. The head is located aft on the starboard side. The interior is finished in teak and the cabin headroom is 

See also
List of sailing boat types

References

External links

Photo of a Sun Odyssey 32.2 showing transom
Photo of a Sun Odyssey 32.2 showing bow

Keelboats
1990s sailboat type designs
Sailing yachts
Sailboat type designs by Jacques Fauroux
Sailboat types built by Jeanneau